Berod bei Wallmerod is an Ortsgemeinde – a community belonging to a Verbandsgemeinde – in the Westerwaldkreis in Rhineland-Palatinate, Germany.

Geography

The community lies in the Westerwald between Montabaur and Wetzlar. Through the community from north to south flows the Eisenbach. The community belongs to the Verbandsgemeinde of Wallmerod, a kind of collective municipality.

History
In 1292, Berod had its first documentary mention as Berrinrode.

Politics

The municipal council is made up of 12 council members who were elected in a majority vote in the municipal election on 7 June 2009.

Economy and infrastructure

Right near the community runs Bundesstraße 8 linking Altenkirchen (Westerwald) and Limburg an der Lahn. The nearest Autobahn interchange is Diez on the A 3 (Cologne–Frankfurt am Main), some 10 km away. The nearest InterCityExpress stop is at the railway station at Montabaur on the Cologne-Frankfurt high-speed rail line.

References

External links
Berod bei Wallmerod in the collective municipality’s Web pages 

Municipalities in Rhineland-Palatinate
Westerwaldkreis